"Bedroom Floor" is a song by English singer and songwriter Liam Payne. It was written by Jacob Kasher, Charlie Puth, Ammar Malik, Steve Mac, Aaron Jennings and Noel Zancanella, with production handled by Mac and Ben Rice. The song was released on 20 October 2017 via Capitol and appears as a bonus track on Payne's debut studio album LP1. It impacted US contemporary hit radio on 24 October 2017.

Background
Payne first revealed the song during his appearance on the Radio 1 Breakfast Show. Payne said of the song, after his girlfriend Cheryl texted host Nick Grimshaw telling him to ask Payne about it: "'Bedroom Floor' was the single before ['Strip That Down'] was the single. Naturally, it could only be the next one. That's going to be my next single and I'm not allowed to say that yet. [Me and Cheryl] both like that song and it's been her favourite from the start." He revealed the song's release date in a tweet on 23 September 2017. Talking about how he will perform the song during the iHeartRadio Jingle Ball Tour, Payne said to Billboard: "I want the visual to be really good for that. It's just a great song, I can never listen to it and get bored. And all my family loves it as well, so I've got to give it some love." He posted a teaser of the song and a preview of its accompanying music video on 17 and 18 October 2017 respectively. A day before the song's release, he debuted the lyrics through Instagram Stories.

Critical reception
Adam Starkey of Metro regarded the song as "a significant improvement over his debut 'Strip That Down', boasting some nice falsetto muscle and a stronger earworm hook" but found the lyrics cringy. Hugh McIntyre of Forbes also felt that the song is "far sweeter than its predecessor", saying that its lyrics are comparatively "naughtier". Ross McNeilage of MTV News praised Payne for "sounding incredible as he shows off his insane falsetto for most of the track", deeming the song "a laidback, luscious dream from the production to his vocals".

Live performances
Payne performed "Bedroom Floor" on The X Factor on 28 October 2017. He later performed the song on the episode of The Ellen DeGeneres Show that aired on 28 November 2017.

Music video
The music video was released on 6 November 2017 and directed by Declan Whitebloom, starring Bella Thorne as Payne's love interest.

Personnel
Credits adapted from Tidal.
 Liam Payne – vocals
 Steve Mac – production, synthesizer
 Ben Rice – production
 Randy Merrill – mastering engineering
 Bill Zimmerman – engineering
 Dann Pursey – engineering
 Chris Laws – engineering, drums
 Phil Tan – mixing

Charts

Certifications

Release history

References

External links
 

2017 songs
2017 singles
Liam Payne songs
Capitol Records singles
Songs written by Charlie Puth
Songs written by Ammar Malik
Songs written by Steve Mac
Songs written by Noel Zancanella
Songs written by Jacob Kasher
Song recordings produced by Ben Rice (producer)